The Bundesliga scandal of 1965 grew out of the failure of the German Football Association (Deutsche Fußball-Bund, DFB) to fully embrace paid professionalism, an aversion rooted in the broader history of sport in the country. Many clubs circumvented the strict financial limits then in place in German football, and it became common practice for clubs to make payments to players or their agents in excess of the limits set by the DFB in an attempt to gain a competitive edge. In addition, some clubs paid players from competing sides to underperform in key matches.

The scandal came to light in February 1965, when the DFB's auditor found discrepancies in the accounts of the Hertha Berlin club that were quickly identified as illegal player payments. Hertha's position in the economic rough and tumble of German football was weakened by the city of Berlin's dangerous political situation as an isolated enclave in the middle of the Soviet-occupied East Germany during the Cold War. Many players did not wish to play in Berlin, and the club was forced into paying premiums beyond even what other teams were already illegally paying. Despite evidence of widespread problems, only Hertha was sanctioned, and the club was relegated from the top-flight Bundesliga to the second division Regionalliga Berlin.

For political reasons, the DFB wished to maintain Berlin's representation within the Bundesliga. In the competition that had been held for promotion to the Bundesliga, Tennis Borussia Berlin had finished at the bottom of their group behind Bayern Munich, 1. FC Saarbrücken, and Alemannia Aachen and so could not be considered for promotion before those clubs. The DFB turned to Spandauer SV, who had finished second in the Regionalliga Berlin, with an offer of promotion that the club refused. Tasmania 1900 Berlin, the third-place finisher and the previous season's champion, was approached next and accepted promotion.

This led to objections from Karlsruher SC and FC Schalke 04, who had been relegated but felt that they still had a better claim to the spot opened by the relegation of Hertha than any of the Berlin-based sides from the Regionalliga. To mollify these clubs, the Bundesliga was expanded from 16 to 18 clubs the following season and the two sides maintained their places in first division competition.

As for the overmatched Tasmania side, their single season in the top flight was the worst-ever season in Bundesliga history, setting records for futility that still stand.

In response to the underlying economic issues the DFB made only a token response, raising the previous limits on transfer fees and player salaries, but not by enough to make the Bundesliga a truly professional league in the broader European context. This laid the groundwork for a second similar scandal some six years later.

References
Ulrich Hesse-Lichtenberger (2002). Tor! The Story of German Football. WSC Books 
Das deutsche Fußball-Archiv historical German domestic league tables (in German)

Bundesliga
Association football controversies
Scandal